Amândio José Malta da Silva (born 19 February 1943) is a Portuguese retired footballer who played as a right back or a central defender.

Club career
Born Benguela, Portuguese Angola, Malta da Silva was discovered by S.L. Benfica's scouting team at Clube Nacional de Benguela. He joined the club in 1964, and made his competitive debut on 3 January of the following year in an away win against Seixal FC, playing five more Primeira Liga games as the season ended in league conquest. Facing heavy competition from Humberto Coelho, Germano, Raúl Machado and Jacinto Santos he appeared mainly in the Taça de Portugal, failing to feature in the league from 8 May 1965 to 23 March 1969.

Malta da Silva had his breakthrough season at the age of 26, starting as right back for Benfica and playing 33 matches in 1969–70, where the Portuguese Cup was won. In the following three campaigns, under Jimmy Hagan, he battled with Adolfo and Artur Correia for the position, but still appeared in over 60 league contests to win the three-peat; however, starting from 1973–74, he gradually lost his importance in the squad, leaving the club in 1976 with official totals of 192 games and one goal.

In 1977, Malta da Silva followed many teammates to the North American Soccer League. He played with António Simões in the San Jose Earthquakes, and then moved to New England Oceaneers in American Soccer League.

Two years later, Malta da Silva embarked on a managerial career with Sport Benfica e Castelo Branco, promoting them from the third division in his first season and finishing twelfth the following year to avoid relegation.

International career
Due to his performances at club level, Malta da Silva received his first call-up to the Portugal national football team in 1971, during the UEFA Euro 1972 qualifying campaign. He made his debut on 17 February in a 1–3 loss in Belgium, and played four more games during the tournament, twice against Scotland and once against Denmark, earning his final cap on 21 November against Belgium.

Honours
Primeira Liga: 1964–65, 1968–69, 1970–71, 1971–72, 1972–73, 1974–75, 1975–76
Taça de Portugal: 1968–69, 1969–70

References
General

Specific

External links

1943 births
Living people
People from Benguela
Portuguese footballers
Association football defenders
Primeira Liga players
S.L. Benfica footballers
Sport Benfica e Castelo Branco players
North American Soccer League (1968–1984) players
American Soccer League (1933–1983) players
San Jose Earthquakes (1974–1988) players
Rhode Island Oceaneers players
Portugal international footballers
Portuguese expatriate footballers
Expatriate soccer players in the United States
Portuguese expatriate sportspeople in the United States
Portuguese football managers